Hjartdal is a municipality in Telemark in the county of Vestfold og Telemark in Norway. It is part of the traditional regions of Upper Telemark and Øst-Telemark. The administrative centre of the municipality is the village of Sauland.   The municipality of Hierdal was established as a municipality on 1 January 1838 (see formannskapsdistrikt). It consists of three parish'es: Hjartdal, Sauland, and Tuddal.

Up to the 1500s Hjartdal parish stretched from Rauland in the west and Kongsberg to the east. Counting from west to east, the villages Åmotsdal, Svartdal, Hjartdal, Tuddal, Sauland, Gransherad, Bolkesjø, Jondalen and Lisleherad was at one point included in the same parish. Sometime after 1687 Lisleherad was transferred to former Heddal parish, and last, Gransherad was separated 1860. At the same time the administrative centre was moved from Hjartdal village to Sauland. Today, the Hjartdal parish and municipality consist of the three villages Hjartdal, Sauland and Tuddal.

General information

Name
The Old Norse form of the name was Hjartdalr. The first element is probably a river name *Hjarta (now called the Hjartdøla river) and the last element is dalr m 'valley, dale'. The river name is derived from hjǫrtr m 'red deer'.

Coat-of-arms

The coat-of-arms is from modern times.  They were granted in 1989. The arms show a silver-colored red deer on a green background.  They are canting arms because the name of the municipality is derived from the word for deer.

Notable residents
 Hans Paus (1656–1715) a Norwegian priest and poet
 Drengman Aaker (1839–1894) an American politician and businessman, served in the Iowa House of Representatives
 Kittel Halvorson (1846–1936) farmer & U.S. Representative from Minnesota
 Knut Buen (born 1948) a Norwegian fiddler, composer, folklorist and publisher; lives in Tuddal
 Sven Tore Løkslid, (Norwegian Wiki) (born 1984) county governor of Telemark, and former mayor of Hjartdal

References

External links

Municipal fact sheet from Statistics Norway

 
Municipalities of Vestfold og Telemark